Half Moon Bay is a summer village in Alberta, Canada. It is located on the western shore of Sylvan Lake, near Sylvan Lake Provincial Park.

Demographics 

In the 2016 Census of Population conducted by Statistics Canada, the Summer Village of Half Moon Bay had a population of 42 living in 20 of its 56 total private dwellings, a  change from its 2011 population of 38.

See also 
List of communities in Alberta
List of summer villages in Alberta
List of resort villages in Saskatchewan

References

External links 

1978 establishments in Alberta
Summer villages in Alberta
Localities in Red Deer County